This Is Not a Burial, It's a Resurrection is a 2019 Mosotho drama film directed by Lemohang Jeremiah Mosese and co-produced by Cait Pansegrouw and Elias Ribeiro. The film stars Mary Twala Mhlongo, with Jerry Mofokeng Wa, Makhaola Ndebele, Tseko Monaheng and Siphiwe Nzima-Ntskhe in supporting roles.

It was selected as the Lesotho entry for the Academy Award for Best International Feature Film at the 93rd Academy Awards, but it was not nominated. It was the first time Lesotho had made a submission in the category. The film received positive reviews from critics and was screened at several international film festivals.

Synopsis
Mantoa, an 80-year old widow, is preparing for the end by arranging her own funeral and bidding farewell to worldly affairs. However, her homeland is being converted into a dam and the residents must be resettled.

Cast
 Mary Twala Mhlongo as Mantoa
 Jerry Mofokeng Wa
 Makhaola Ndebele 
 Tseko Monaheng 
 Siphiwe Nzima-Ntskhe

Reception 
The site's critical consensus reads, "This Is Not a Burial, It's a Resurrection stands in the fault line between the cradle of tradition and tomorrow, defiantly insisting that one need not exist at the expense of the other." Guy Lodge of Variety wrote that the film is "a haunted, unsentimental paean to land and its physical containment of community and ancestry — all endangered by nominally progressive infrastructure".

Accolades 
At the 2020 Africa Movie Academy Awards, the film was nominated for seven awards, ultimately winning Best Costume Design, Best Cinematography, Best Actress in a Leading Role, and Best Director.

See also
 List of submissions to the 93rd Academy Awards for Best International Feature Film
 List of Lesotho submissions for the Academy Award for Best International Feature Film

References

External links
 
 This Is Not a Burial, It's a Resurrection in YouTube

2019 films
Lesotho drama films
2019 drama films